Matthaeus (also Matthæus) is a given name, the Latin form of Matthew. Notable people with the name include:

 Matthaeus Greuter (1564–1638), German etcher and engraver who worked in Rome
 Matthaeus Pipelare  (c. 1450 – c. 1515), Netherlandish composer, choir director, and possibly wind instrument player of the Renaissance
 Matthaeus Platearius (12th century), physician from the medical school at Salerno
 Matthaeus Silvaticus (c. 1280 – c. 1342), Latin medical writer and botanist
 Matthæus Yrsselius (1541–1629), abbot of St. Michael's Abbey, Antwerp from 1614 until his death

Latin masculine given names